"Bad Decisions" is a song by American record producer Benny Blanco, South Korean boy band BTS and American rapper Snoop Dogg. It was released through Interscope Records, Friends Keep Secrets, and Joytime Collective as a single on August 5, 2022. The song was described as "a euphoric, flirty dance track" that sees the BTS members and Snoop talking about a loved one they want to spend time with.

Background and Release
In an interview with The A.V. Club in March 2022, Snoop Dogg revealed that he had a collaboration with BTS. In April 2022, while backstage at American Song Contest, a show in which he is a host, Snoop Dogg informed a magazine, Buzz, of the completion of his contributions to the song. On July 20, 2022, Benny Blanco unveiled a schedule with the release dates of the song's music videos on his Twitter page. On the same day, BTS released comedic videos promoting the song starring themselves and Blanco. On August 5, BTS's YouTube channel also released a lyric video and recording sketch. This is the second time that Blanco and BTS have worked with. He incorporated remixes of the band's songs "Life Goes On," "Blood Sweat and Tears," and "Fake Love" earlier this year.

Music and Lyrics 
Bad Decisions was co-produced by benny blanco, Blake Slatkin, Cashmere Cat and Mike Posner on the guitar, who received a writing crediting as well. It was described as a dance track with a catchy tempo and lyrics that express genuine feelings for the one you love in a cool way on a hot summer day.

Commercial Performance 
In the United States, "Bad Decisions" debuted at No.10 on the Billboard Hot 100 with 10.1 million streams, 3.1 million radio plays, and 66,000 sales (45,000 digital downloads, 16,000 CDs, and 5,000 cassettes) in its first week. The track became BTS' tenth song and benny blanco's second (after "Eastside," with Halsey and Khalid at No. 9 on 2019) Hot 100 Top 10. BTS is the first South Korean artist to have at least 10 Hot 100 top 10s. It also debuted at No. 1 on Digital Song Sales list, becoming BTS' 11th No. 1—the most among duos or groups; Snoop Dogg's fifth; and benny blanco's first—as well as No. 28 on Streaming Songs.

Music video
The official music video for "Bad Decisions" premiered on Benny Blanco's YouTube channel alongside the release of the song on August 5, 2022. Ben Sinclair directed the music video.

The concept of the video is a countdown to a BTS concert, with Blanco serving as our featured fan. On the day of the event, Blanco kisses his ticket and throws a finger heart at his wall of posters honoring the group. Blanco is all set to leave after doing the choreography to "Dynamite" with his Army Bomb lightstick, constructing a cake with a BTS theme, and creating a collage of the members in the shape of a heart. While en route to the stadium, he accidentally ruins his cake. Once he arrives at the stadium, he finds it empty. A janitor then informs the superfan that he has arrived a day early and locks the superfan out.

Track listing
Cassette
A-side
 "Bad Decision" – 2:52
B-side
 "Bad Decision" (instrumental) – 2:52

CD single 
 "Bad Decision" – 2:52
 "Bad Decision" (instrumental) – 2:52

 Digital
 "Bad Decision" – 2:52
Digital (Acoustic)
 "Bad Decision" (acoustic) – 2:54
Digital (Instrumental)

 "Bad Decision" (instrumental) – 2:52

Charts

Weekly charts

Monthly charts

Year-end charts

Release history

References

2022 songs
2022 singles
Interscope Records singles
Benny Blanco songs
BTS songs
Snoop Dogg songs
Songs written by Benny Blanco
Songs written by Snoop Dogg
Songs written by Mike Posner
Songs written by Cashmere Cat
Song recordings produced by Benny Blanco
Song recordings produced by Cashmere Cat